Nyhavn 35 is a historic townhouse overlooking the Nyhavn Canal in central Copenhagen, Denmark.

History

17th and 18th centuries

The property was by 1689 as No. 13 owned by the widow of Niels Christensen Roskilde. A two-storey building was constructed in around 1700. The property was listed as No. 18 in the new cadastre of 1756 and was at that time owned by skibsmåler Peder Nielsen- It was heightened with one story in 1785.

The property had by 1787 been acquired by porcelain merchant Jens Holbeck. He was by then residing in the building with his wife Anna Maria Bechs Datter	, their two children (aged two and four), 24-year-oldAnna Licht, two employees in the porcelain business (one of them an apprentice) and two maids.

19th century
 
By 1801m Jens Holbeck had become a widower. He was now residing in the building with his three children (aged 13 to 18), two employees in his wholesale business, a housekeeper and a maid.

The  property was again listed as No. 18 in the new cadastre of 1806. It was by then still owned by Holbeck.

At the time of the 1834 census, No 18 was home to three households. Andreas Peter Berggreen, a music teacher and composer, resided on the second floor with his wife Dorothea Frederikke Berggreen (née Wettergreen), their two children (aged one and five) and one maid. Erik Rasmus Peter Eskildsen	 and Peter Duus resided on the first floor. Eskildsen worked the Danish Admiralty with title of krigsassessor. Duus lived from his means. Axel Christian Black and Frederikke Margarethe Hedevig Black (née Søegaard), a skipper and a tea and porcelain merchant, respectively, resided on the ground floor with their three children (aged 14 to 18) and a maid.

The composer and musician Andreas Peter Berggreen lived in the building in the mid-1830s. 
The building was again heightened with one storey in 1855. Moritz Levy (1824-1892), who would later become manager of the Bank of Denmark, lived in the building in 1853.

Architecture
The building is four stories tall and five bays wide.

Today
The building is one of few buildings on the sunny side of Nyhavn that does not have a restaurant of café at street level.

References

Listed residential buildings in Copenhagen
Houses completed in 1700